Bolanle Patience Ambode (née Odukomaiya) (born 15 February 1964) was the First Lady of Lagos State, from 29 May 2015 to 29 May 2019, when her husband Akinwunmi Ambode was governor of Lagos State.

References

People from Lagos State
First Ladies of Lagos State
Living people
1964 births